Tetramorium schmitzi is a species of ant in the genus Tetramorium. It is endemic to Israel.

References

schmitzi
Hymenoptera of Asia
Insects of the Middle East
Endemic fauna of Israel
Insects described in 1910
Taxonomy articles created by Polbot
Taxobox binomials not recognized by IUCN